Jean-Baptiste Paul Cabet (1 February 1815, Nuits, Yonne – 1876, Paris), was a French sculptor. He was the pupil of François Rude, his stepfather. Having achieved his own fame, he was the author of the statue known under the name of Résistance as a witness to the heroic fightings in Dijon during the 1870 war and other statues located in the Musée d'Orsay in Paris.

Main works
 Saint Martin partageant son manteau, Musée d'Orsay
 Mil huit cent soixante et onze, Musée d'Orsay
 Chant et Poésie, Musée d'Orsay
 Désespoir, Musée d'Orsay
 Résistance
 Suzanne surprise au bain, 1861, Musée d'Orsay

References

1815 births
1876 deaths
People from Yonne
19th-century French sculptors
French male sculptors
19th-century French male artists